Novosibirsk Chemical Engineering Technical School named after D. I. Mendeleev is an educational institution founded in 1929. The school is located between Nizhegorodskaya, Sacco and Vanzetti and Sadovaya streets in Oktyabrsky City District of Novosibirsk, Russia.

History
The school was founded in 1929. In 1932, constructivist building was built for the school (architect: A. I. Bobrov).

See also
 Polyclinic No. 1
 Rabochaya Pyatiletka

References

Oktyabrsky District, Novosibirsk
Buildings and structures in Novosibirsk
School buildings completed in 1932
Constructivist architecture
Educational institutions established in 1929
Education in Novosibirsk
Chemistry education
1929 establishments in the Soviet Union
Cultural heritage monuments of regional significance in Novosibirsk Oblast